= Gandhipuram, East Godavari =

Gandhipuram
- Village
- Interactive map of Gandhipuram
- Location in Andhra Pradesh, India Gandhipuram (India)
- Coordinates: 17.00°N 81.79°E
- Country: India
- State: Andhra Pradesh
- Region: Rajahmundry
- District: East Godavari district

Languages
  - Official: Telugu
- Time zone: UTC+5:30 (IST)
- PIN: 533103

Gandhipuram is a locality situated in East Godavari district within Rajahmundry town in Andhra Pradesh State.
